Arbanaško is a village in the municipality of Staro Nagoričane, North Macedonia.

Name
The name is mentioned in the 1330 Serbian document by King Milutin, and is derived from the word Arbanas meaning "Albanian" with the Slavic suffix ko/ka, meaning "place of the Albanians".

Demographics
According to the 2002 census, the village had a total of 237 inhabitants. Ethnic groups in the village include:

Macedonians 38
Serbs 1
 Others 1

References

Villages in Staro Nagoričane Municipality
Serb communities in North Macedonia